Raisa Andriana, better known by her mononym Raisa (born in Jakarta on 6 June 1990), is an Indonesian singer and songwriter. She became publicly known for her song titled "Serba Salah". Prior to her solo career, she was one of the lead vocalist of Kevin Aprilio's band, Andante, which later renamed as Vierra (now Vierratale).

Raisa has received a number of accolades, including Indonesian Music Awards, Music Planet Awards, and Mnet Asian Music Awards. In 2014, she was charted at 45th place on Billboard Uncharted, marking her first time to enter the Billboard chart. Later in 2017, she reached 29th place on Billboard Social 50, a chart which ranks the most active musical artists on the world's leading social networking services.

Background
Raisa Andriana was born on 6 June 1990 in Jakarta, Indonesia to Allan Rachman and Ria Mariaty. She studied at Binus University. Raisa's singing talent was shown since her early age. When she was 3, Raisa often pretended to be a singer on stage. Growing up with minimal music education, she picked up her unique singing style and voice through some of her favorite singers such as Brian Mcknight, India Arie, Stevie Wonder, Joss Stone etc.

Career

2008–2010: Career beginning and "Andante"
Her career as a singer began when she collaborated with famous composer David Foster to perform in a concert in Jakarta. She was the vocalist of Andante, a band founded by Kevin Aprilio. In 2008 the band was reshaped and named Vierra, consisting of five members: Raisa, Widi Soediro, Raka Cyril, Satrianda Widjanarko, and Kevin Aprilio himself. She exited the band when the record's label decided it wanted a different concept.

2010–2013: Early success with debut album
Raisa started gaining recognition with her single "Serba Salah". The song led her to gain popularity in Indonesian music industry. She then won an award in Indonesian Music Awards for Best of the Best Newcomer category.

Her debut album, Raisa, was produced and released in 2011 by Solid Records and Universal Music Indonesia. The album was supported by the young musicians who collaborated as producers: Asta Andoko (RAN), Ramadhan Handy (Soulvibe), and Adrianto Ario Seto (Soulvibe). Nanda Oka and Asta Andoko are Executive Producers of Solid Records.

2013–2015: Heart To Heart and Indonesian Idol

Raisa launched her second album, titled Heart to Heart on 27 November 2013. The album featured two singles "Bye-Bye" and "Pemeran Utama". She also performed a concert "Heart to Heart Showcase: Happy (Raisa's version)", targeted for the media and 300 of 'YourRaisa' fans that had been previously selected by pre-ordering the Raisa box set online.

On 25 August 2013, she opened Metallica's concert in Jakarta with Indonesian rock/metal band Seringai, performing Indonesia's national anthem "Indonesia Raya".

In 2014, Raisa was appointed as a guest judge for a television talent show: Indonesian Idol Season 8. At first, she was a guest judge but later became permanently involved. In February 2015, Walt Disney Pictures selected Raisa to sing the soundtrack "A Dream Is a Wish Your Heart Makes" translated to the Indonesian version "Mimpi adalah Harapan Hati" for a Disney remake of Cinderella.

2015–present: Handmade and The Voice Indonesia
In 2015, Raisa collaborated with singer Afgan for soundtrack film London Love Story, titled "Percayalah". She released her third studio album Handmade in 2016 under label Juni Records and produced two singles "Jatuh Hati" and "Kali Kedua".

In April 2016, Raisa performed a concert "Handmade Showcase" which was held on Ciputra Artpreneur. She is currently preparing to perform in tours in major Indonesian cities: "Handmade Tour" which will begin on August until September.

In June 2016, Raisa was a guest star for the Grand Final of The Voice Indonesia Season 2 where she performed a song "Cahaya Cantik Harimu". Raisa was appointed as a guest star at the Peabo Bryson' Live in Concert – Celebrating 40 Years of Magic in The Hall, Senayan City. In that occasion, she performed a duet "Beauty and the Beast" and "A Whole New World" with him.

Personal life
Raisa Andriana married Australian-born Indonesian actor Hamish Daud on Sunday, 3 September 2017.

Discography

Studio albums

Mini album 
 It's Personal (2021)

Compilation album

Singles

Filmography

Awards and nominations

References

External links

 Official site
 
 Raisa discography on Discogs
 Raisa discography on iTunes

1990 births
English-language singers from Indonesia
Living people
20th-century Indonesian women singers
Indonesian pop singers
Indonesian rhythm and blues singers
Indonesian jazz singers
People from Jakarta
Anugerah Musik Indonesia winners
MAMA Award winners